The 2018 Alpine Elf Europa Cup was the inaugural season of the Alpine Elf Europa Cup, the one-make sports car racing series organized by Alpine for Alpine A110 Cup cars. It began on 27 April at Le Castellet and finished on 12 October, at Monza after six double-header meetings.

Entry List

Race calendar and results 

 A five-round calendar was revealed along with the announcement of the series on 26 October 2017. The schedule consisted of 5 circuits for the first year of the series with all rounds supporting either the International GT Open or the FFSA GT Championship.

Drivers' Championship 

 Scoring system

Points are awarded to the top 20 drivers. If less than 75% of the race distance is completed then half points are awarded. If less than two laps are completed then no points are given.

Notes

External links 

 Official website

References 

Alpine Elf Europa Cup seasons
Alpine Elf Europa Cup